PPS.tv (PPStream) is a Chinese peer-to-peer streaming video network software. Since the target users are on the Chinese mainland, there is no official English version, and the vast majority of channels are from East Asia, mostly Mainland China, Japan, South Korea, Hong Kong, Taiwan, Malaysia, and Singapore. Programmes vary from Chinese movies to Japanese anime, sports channels, as well as popular American TV and films.

It had an 8.9% market share in China in Q3 2010, placing it third - behind Youku and Tudou. In May 2013, the online video business of PPS.tv was purchased by Baidu for $370 million. After the acquisition, PPS.tv continued to operate as a sub-brand under iQIYI, Baidu's online video platform.

Applications

However, the nature of peer to peer serving means that each user of the system is also a server. The upload speed of standard home broadband connections is usually a fraction of the download speed, so several upload sources may be required by each additional peer. Additionally, on services with high contention ratios or poorly configured switches, large numbers of people attempting to use the service may slow all internet usage to unusable speeds. Acting as an upload server to the limit of one's uploads, bandwidth increases the round trip time for webpage requests, making web browsing while using PPS.tv difficult.

See also
PPLive
CoolStreaming - a similar project

References

External links
Official site 

IQIYI
Chinese entertainment websites
File sharing networks
Streaming television
Peercasting
Software that uses Qt
Peer-to-peer software